Jean-Claude Malgoire (25 November 1940 – 14 April 2018) was a French oboist and later conductor.

Early life
Malgoire was born on 25 November 1940 in Avignon, France. His mother was born in Italy.

Malgoire graduated from the Paris Conservatory.

Career
Malgoire began his career as an oboist. He played the cor anglais for the Orchestre de Paris, under the direction of conductor Charles Munch. Over the course of his career, he played for conductors Herbert von Karajan, Georg Solti and Seiji Ozawa. In 1971, he played the cor anglais in Ravel's Piano Concerto alongside pianist Samson François, conducted by André Cluytens. He also played the cor anglais in Richard Wagner's Tristan und Isolde.

Malgoire founded La Grande Écurie et la Chambre du Roy, a period-instrument Baroque music ensemble, in 1966. He played the works of Jean-Baptiste Lully, Marc-Antoine Charpentier, André Campra, and Jean-Philippe Rameau. He also founded the Florilegium Musicum de Paris, a medieval music group. In 1972, he joined Ensemble 2e2m founded by Paul Méfano. He  was the artistic director of the Atelier lyrique in Tourcoing from 1981 to 2018. 

Malgoire was awarded the Victoires de la Musique in 1992.

Death
Malgoire died on 14 April 2018 in 14th arrondissement of Paris.

References

Further reading

1940 births
2018 deaths
Musicians from Avignon
French people of Italian descent
Conservatoire de Paris alumni
French conductors (music)
French male conductors (music)
French performers of early music
French classical oboists
Male oboists
Officiers of the Ordre des Arts et des Lettres
20th-century French musicologists
Handel Prize winners